The Best of Irish Piping is a two CD boxset incorporating The Pure Drop and The Fox Chase albums by Seamus Ennis.  Liam O'Flynn wrote the sleevenotes.

Tracks

Musicians
Seamus Ennis - uilleann pipes

References
Record Label Catalogue 2009
Album Sleevenotes

1974 compilation albums
Séamus Ennis albums